Robert Caste (6 November 1896 – 15 November 1963) was a French sprinter. He competed in the men's 200 metres at the 1920 Summer Olympics.

References

External links
 

1896 births
1963 deaths
Athletes (track and field) at the 1920 Summer Olympics
French male sprinters
Olympic athletes of France
Place of birth missing